Gregor Braun (born 31 December 1955) is a retired track cyclist and road bicycle racer from Germany, who was a professional rider from 1977 to 1989 and who became a multiple Olympic Gold medaillist and track world champion. his profession was a locksmith.

He represented West Germany at the 1976 Summer Olympics in Montreal, Canada, where he won the gold medal in both the men's individual pursuit and in the team pursuit with Peter Vonhof, Hans Lutz and Günther Schumacher, corroborating their win a year before, also as amateurs, with capturing the gold in the men's team pursuit in the 1975 world championships in Montreal. The West German Olympic track team for 1976 was managed by former track champion Gustav Kilian.
In 1977 Braun turned professional, riding mostly on the road and proving himself a capable rider on the road by winning, inter alia, the Giro di Sardegna (1983, 1980), the 14th stage of the 1983 Giro d'Italia, Kuurne–Brussels–Kuurne (1982), the Tre Valli Varesine (1981), Milano–Vignola (1981), the Deutschland Tour (1980), the Tour d'Indre-et-Loire (1979), the then Rund um den Henninger-Turm, three national road championships (1983, 1980, 1978) and ending on the podium in the 1982 Paris–Roubaix, the 1982 Amstel Gold Race and the 1978 Tour of Flanders.

On the track as a professional, Braun became world champion in the (then) 5k pursuit in the 1977 world championships and the 1978 track world championships and won bronze in this discipline in 1985. Furthermore, he won the 1979 European championships madison (with Patrick Sercu). 
Additionally, Braun started in 44 (mostly German) six-day races, 4 to 6 per season, resulting in 11 wins, with Patrick Sercu (4 wins), René Pijnen (4×), Dietrich Thurau (2×) and Gert Frank (1×) and proving himself very well able to win these races when coupled with a top six-days rider.

Major results

Road

1974
 2nd Rund um Düren
1977
 2nd Overall Étoile des Espoirs
1st Prologue (TTT)
 2nd Overall Circuit Cycliste Sarthe
 6th Grand Prix des Nations
 9th Overall Tour Méditerranéen
1st Stage 2a
 10th Rund um den Henninger Turm
1978
 1st  Road race, National Road Championships
 1st Rund um den Henninger Turm
 1st Prologue Tour Méditerranéen
 1st Prologue (TTT) Tour d'Indre-et-Loire
 3rd Tour of Flanders
 6th Critérium des As
 7th Amstel Gold Race
 10th Overall Tour of Belgium
1st Stage 3
1979
 1st  Overall Tour d'Indre-et-Loire
 1st Stage 4 Tour Méditerranéen
 3rd Rund um den Henninger Turm
 4th Overall Four Days of Dunkirk
 9th Grand Prix des Nations
1980
 1st  Road race, National Road Championships
 1st  Overall Deutschland Tour
 1st  Overall Giro di Sardegna
1st Stage 2b (ITT)
 1st Stage 5 (ITT) Tirreno–Adriatico
 1st Stage 2b Tour d'Indre-et-Loire
 2nd Overall Cronostaffetta (TTT)
1st Stage 1c (ITT)
 3rd Nice–Alassio
 5th Trofeo Pantalica
1981
 1st Tre Valli Varesine
 1st Milano–Vignola
 1st Flèche Hesbignonne
 2nd GP Union Dortmund
 3rd Overall Ruota d'Oro
 4th Gent–Wevelgem
1982
 1st Kuurne–Brussels–Kuurne
 3rd Paris–Roubaix
 3rd Amstel Gold Race
 5th Overall Tirreno–Adriatico
1st Stage 5
 5th Rund um den Henninger Turm
 5th Paris–Brussels
 10th Brabantse Pijl
 10th Gent–Wevelgem
1983
 1st  Road race, National Road Championships
 1st  Overall Giro di Sardegna
 1st Stage 14 Giro d'Italia
 2nd Trofeo Laigueglia
 6th Gent–Wevelgem
 10th Overall Three Days of De Panne
1984
 5th Paris–Roubaix
 7th Tour of Flanders
1985
 2nd Firenze–Pistoia
1987
 1st Stage 1a (ITT) Setmana Catalana de Ciclisme

Track

1973
 National Junior Track Championships
1st  Madison
1st  Individual pursuit
 2nd  Individual pursuit, European Junior Track Championships
1975
 1st  Team pursuit, UCI Amateur Track World Championships
 National Amateur Track Championships
1st  Individual pursuit
1st  Madison
1976
 Olympic Games
1st  Individual pursuit
1st  Team pursuit
 National Amateur Track Championships
1st  Individual pursuit
1st  Madison
1977
 1st  Individual pursuit, UCI Track World Championships
1978
 1st  Individual pursuit, UCI Track World Championships
 1st  Madison (with Patrick Sercu), European Track Championships
 1st Six Days of Munich (with Patrick Sercu)
1979
 1st Six Days of Cologne (with Patrick Sercu)
 1st Six Days of Frankfurt (with René Pijnen)
1980
 1st Six Days of Dortmund (with Patrick Sercu)
 1st Six Days of Berlin (with Patrick Sercu)
 1st Six Days of Frankfurt (with René Pijnen)
1981
 1st Six Days of Berlin (with Dietrich Thurau)
 1st Six Days of Frankfurt (with Dietrich Thurau)
 1st Six Days of Bremen (with René Pijnen)
1983
 1st  Madison (with Henry Rinklin), National Track Championships
 1st Six Days of Bremen (with René Pijnen)
1984
 1st Six Days of Stuttgart (with Gert Frank)
1985
 3rd  Individual pursuit, UCI Track World Championships

References

External links
 
 
 
 
 

1955 births
Living people
People from Neustadt an der Weinstraße
German male cyclists
Cyclists at the 1976 Summer Olympics
Olympic cyclists of West Germany
Olympic gold medalists for West Germany
Olympic medalists in cycling
Cyclists from Rhineland-Palatinate
German cycling road race champions
UCI Track Cycling World Champions (men)
Medalists at the 1976 Summer Olympics
German track cyclists
20th-century German people